Robert Newell, D.D. was an English Anglican priest in the 17th century.

Morton was educated at St John's College, Cambridge;  and incorporated at Oxford in 1600. He held livings at Wormley, Cheshunt, Islip, Clothall and North Crawley. He was Archdeacon of Buckingham from 1614 until his death in 1642.

Notes

17th-century English Anglican priests
Archdeacons of Buckingham
Alumni of St John's College, Cambridge
16th-century births
1642 deaths
Year of birth missing